Björn Stenvers  (born 25 May 1972, in Arnhem) is the CEO of the Eye Care Foundation. Before he was CEO at the Fonds de dotation de l’ICOM (of the International Council of Museums).
He was the director of the foundation of the Official Museums of Amsterdam (2013-2016) which he also founded. Björn was the only Dutch lecturer in the program for Ministers of Culture of the Russian Presidential Academy of National Economy and Public Administration (2015-2022).

In 2017 Stenvers founded the Moscow Zoo Academy, the Altai Museum Academy, the Aruba Museum Academy,in 2015 the Amsterdam Museum Academy, and in 2014 Rostov Kremlin Museum Academy, for museum staff trainings.
He holds a number of board positions; chair of the People's University of Amsterdam, chair of the Nepal Federation Netherlands (NFN), ICOM Europe, the Amsterdam Light Festival and trustee of the World Heritage Site of Brest Fortress. He has several degrees in Art History, Marketing and Management. Stenvers is married to singer Tamara Hoekwater. He is the great-grandchild of the Austrian composer Franz R. Friedl.

Awards and honours
 Knight Commander of the Royal Order of Monisaraphon

Publications
 The little book of eyes by Winksy. Phnom Penh, 2022, 
 Siku katika maisha ya Leyla & Ray. ECF: Dar Es Salaam, 2022, 
 The little Coloring Book of eyes by Winksy, Amsterdam, 2022, 
 A day in the life of Hy & Ry. ECF: Saigon, 2021, 
 Museum visitors with Hearing Disabilities, Publishing House Pero, Moscow, 2017, 
 Amsterdam Museum Monitor, Amsterdam, 2016,  . 
 Marketing from the Papagajnika: the three "P"'s on museum marketing for cities, Moscow, 2017, .
 Amsterdam Museums: a better return through cooperation, Berlin, 2017
 Museums in cities working together: more collaboration: better returns, Murmansk, 2015
 Kleurboek - Colouring book, Museums of Amsterdam, Bekking & Blitz Publishing, Amersfoort, 2015, . 
 Amsterdam Museum Monitor, Amsterdam, 2015 
 What is the situation of the Libraries in Europe within 7 years (2021) via seven P’s, Amersfoort, 2014

References

External links
 Russian Presidential Academy
 Eye Care Foundation
 Moscow Zoo Academy

People from Arnhem
1972 births
Living people
Museum people
Dutch nonprofit directors
University of Amsterdam alumni
Museum founders
Founders of academic institutions
Founders of educational institutions
School founders
Nonprofit chief executives
Dutch chief executives
Members of the Royal Order of Monisaraphon